In German politics, a traffic light coalition is a coalition government of the Social Democratic Party of Germany (SPD), the Free Democratic Party (FDP) and Alliance 90/The Greens. It is named after the parties' traditional colours, respectively red, yellow, and green, matching the colour sequence of a traffic light (Ampel). The term is also used for similar coalitions between social democrats, liberals and greens in other countries.

History
At a state level, early traffic light coalitions occurred in Brandenburg between 1990 and 1994 and in Bremen between 1991 and 1995. Negotiations to form such a coalition following the 2001 Berlin state election were not successful; likewise, preliminary talks after the 2010 North Rhine-Westphalia state election led to no result. A traffic light coalition was formed in Rhineland-Palatinate following the 2016 Rhineland-Palatinate state election. The 2021 Rhineland-Palatinate state election marked the first time in German history that an outgoing traffic light coalition was replaced by a renewed traffic light coalition in a state election.

Historically, there have been red-green coalitions between the SPD and the Greens (from 1998 to 2005) and social-liberal coalitions between the SPD and the FDP (from 1969 to 1982) in the Bundestag. Despite the common ground on cultural liberalism between the three parties, the FDP's economic liberalism and long association at the federal level with the conservative Christian Democratic Union (CDU) traditionally made such a coalition problematic, with former FDP chairman Guido Westerwelle explicitly ruling out this option for the 2009 federal election. Previously, the inconclusive 2005 federal election had produced media speculation about a traffic light coalition, but no such coalition was formed.

Following the 2021 federal election, the SPD emerged as the largest party in the Bundestag, but did not have enough seats to govern outright. With the SPD and the CDU ruling out a grand coalition with each other, a traffic light coalition was viewed as the most likely outcome by many in the media. On 24 November 2021, the SPD, Greens, and FDP announced that they had reached a deal to implement the coalition, with SPD candidate Olaf Scholz set to become chancellor. The coalition went into effect when Scholz and his cabinet took office on 8 December 2021.

Traffic light coalitions in other countries

Austria
In Austria, the term Ampelkoalition has been borrowed from Germany to describe a theoretical coalition of the Social Democratic Party of Austria (SPÖ), The Greens, and a liberal party. In the 1990s, this referred to the Liberal Forum (LiF). In the 2010s, the term reemerged to describe a theoretical coalition of the SPÖ, Greens, and NEOS – The New Austria, the latter of which is the successor to the Liberal Forum. NEOS's colour is pink, rather than yellow.

Belgium
The Verhofstadt I Government of Belgium, headed by Prime Minister Guy Verhofstadt from 1999 to 2003, comprised liberals (the Flemish Liberals and Democrats and French-speaking Liberal Reformist Party), socialists (the Flemish Socialist Party and the French-speaking Socialist Party), and greens (the Flemish Agalev and the French-speaking Ecolo). However, as the political colours of the liberal parties were blue instead of yellow, it was known as the "purple-green" coalition.

Luxembourg
Following the 2013 general election in Luxembourg, negotiations started with the aim of forming a three-party coalition government comprising the Luxembourg Socialist Workers' Party (LSAP), the Democratic Party (DP) and The Greens in order to oust the Christian Social People's Party (CSV) of the incumbent Prime Minister Jean-Claude Juncker. This variant on the traffic light coalition is known as a "Gambia coalition", as the party colours match the flag of the Gambia, and Luxembourg's liberal party (DP) uses blue as its party colour rather than yellow.

United Kingdom
In the United Kingdom the term has been used to describe a coalition between the Labour Party, the Liberal Democrats and the Green Party of England and Wales, notably that which has run the City of Lancaster district council from time to time, including from the 2019 election.

See also
Jamaica coalition
Grand coalition
 Black-red-green coalition
 Red–green alliance
 Red–red coalition
 Social–liberal coalition

References

Political history of Germany

Elections
Progressivism in Germany
Social Democratic Party of Germany
Free Democratic Party (Germany)
Alliance 90/The Greens